Until 1 January 2007 Egvad was a municipality in Ringkjøbing County near the west coast of the Jutland peninsula in west Denmark. Its last mayor was Kent Skaanning. The municipality's main town and the site of its municipal council was Tarm. Ringkøbing Fjord defined its northwestern border.

Egvad municipality ceased to exist due to Kommunalreformen ("The Municipality Reform" of 2007). It will be merged with existing Holmsland, Ringkøbing, Skjern, and Videbæk municipalities to form the new Ringkøbing-Skjern Municipality. The new municipality belongs to the new Region Midtjylland ("Mid-Jutland Region").

External links
 Ringkøbing-Skjern's municipality's official website 
 The new Ringkøbing Fjord municipality's official cooperation and tourism information website
 Ringkøbing Fjord South, Tarm-Egvad tourist bureau

References  
 Municipal statistics: NetBorger Kommunefakta, delivered from KMD aka Kommunedata (Municipal Data)
 Municipal mergers and neighbors: Eniro new municipalities map

Former municipalities of Denmark